Emmanuel Alobwede Eseme (born 17 August 1993) is a Cameroonian sprinter. He competed in the men's 200 metres at the 2019 World Athletics Championships held in Doha, Qatar. He did not qualify to compete in the semi-finals.

In the same year, he also competed in the men's 200 metres and men's 4 × 100 metres relay events at the 2019 African Games, in both cases without winning a medal.

He represented Cameroon at the 2020 Summer Olympics in Tokyo, Japan in the men's 200 metres event.

References

External links 
 

Living people
1993 births
Place of birth missing (living people)
Cameroonian male sprinters
World Athletics Championships athletes for Cameroon
Athletes (track and field) at the 2019 African Games
African Games competitors for Cameroon
Athletes (track and field) at the 2020 Summer Olympics
Olympic athletes of Cameroon
Athletes (track and field) at the 2022 Commonwealth Games
21st-century Cameroonian people